KAPS (660 AM) is a radio station  broadcasting a country music format to the Mount Vernon, Washington, United States, area. The station is owned by J & J Broadcasting, INC and features programming from Westwood One.  The signal reaches many parts of Skagit County, as far north as Vancouver, BC, and as far south as Lynnwood and Edmonds at times. KAPS was formerly owned by Totem Broadcasters, Inc. with George B. Aller, owner and President, who sold the station in 1979. It also operates a translator station simulcasting its signal on 102.1 FM, K271AH.

References

External links

FCC History Cards for KAPS

APS
Country radio stations in the United States
Radio stations established in 1963